The Darvel and Strathaven Railway linked, with the Darvel Branch to the former Glasgow, Paisley, Kilmarnock and Ayr Railway in Scotland to allow trains to travel between Kilmarnock and Lanarkshire.

History
On 4 July 1905 the line opened, connecting with the Darvel Branch, which became a through line to Strathaven which was a jointly run line between the Glasgow and South Western Railway and the Caledonian Railway. However, despite being a through line, no trains ever ran between Kilmarnock and Strathaven; instead, the two companies took it in turns to run the line between Darvel and Strathaven every six months.

The line was never successful and closed in 1939. Evidence of the line still exists today in the form of many embankment, bridges and cuttings along the route.

Connections to other lines 
 Darvel Branch west of Darvel
 Mid Lanarks Lines of the Caledonian Railway at Strathaven
 Hamilton and Strathaven Railway at Strathaven

References

Notes

Sources
 
 
 
 
 
 RAILSCOT on Darvel and Strathaven Railway

Pre-grouping British railway companies
Early Scottish railway companies
Railway lines opened in 1905
1905 establishments in Scotland